Leigh Michael Broxham (born 13 January 1988) is an Australian professional footballer who plays as a midfielder for Melbourne Victory in the A-League. As of May 2021, he currently holds the record for most appearances for Melbourne Victory, playing 427 times across multiple competitions. Broxham is one of the A-league's most decorated players having played in all of Melbourne Victory's title-winning sides including four championships, three premierships and two FFA Cups. A natural defensive midfielder, Broxham nicknamed "Broxjajlovic", Lord Broxenbauer or simply "The Brox" can also play as an attacking midfielder, central midfielder, brox to brox midfielder, centre back, left back or right back. Broxham was named captain of Melbourne Victory at the commencement of the 2021 A-League season.

Born in Melbourne, Broxham played youth football at the Victorian Institute of Sport before making his professional debut in 2007 for Melbourne Victory, where he continued to play for over a decade and 300 appearances.

Broxham has made 1 appearance for Australia, in a debut on a friendly match which ended a draw with Singapore in 2008.

Club career
The attacking midfielder, who is known for his long range free kicks, sharp passing and toughness, joined the Victorian Institute of Sport whilst playing his club football at Knox City in Melbourne's east in 2003. He was selected as captain of the Victorian under 16 squad in 2004 before representing Australia the following year at the under 17 FIFA World Cup in Peru. Recruited from the Victorian Institute of Sport by Melbourne Victory FC, Broxham trained with the first-team squad for twelve months as the Football Team Assistant before being brought in to the actual squad prior to Round 19.

It was announced on 21 March 2007 that Broxham had signed a new three-year deal with the club. Leigh was left out of the squad for the majority of the 2008/2009 championship season. However, after having an excellent pre season, including scoring a 25-yard free kick and assisting multiple goals, he has played every game in the 2009/10 season. Broxham was the second of six nominees that will vie for the inaugural NAB Young Footballer of the Year Award at the conclusion of the Hyundai A-League 2009/10 season.

He scored his first ever goal for Melbourne in their clash against Sydney FC in the opening round of the 2010–11 A-League season.  Broxham has become a firm fan favourite for his excellent technique, and has inherited the popular moniker "Broxhajlovic" for his free kick prowess.

In the 2012–2013 A-league season under new boss Ange Postecoglou, Leigh Broxham initially began the season with lacklustre performances including a 5–0 defeat against Brisbane Roar. However, since the injuries of several key Melbourne Victory defenders, he was asked to fill in at centre back against Sydney FC and Newcastle Jets Alessandro Del Piero and Emile Heskey and performed admirably inspiring new chants from the Victory supporters. His goal against Brisbane Roar later in the season with a flying header attempt summed up the success of his season which was rewarded by a further 3-year contract.

With Melbourne Victory finishing 3rd, they subsequently qualified for a play-off match in order to participate in the Asian Champions League. On 15 February 2014, Melbourne Victory faced Muangthong United who were 2nd in their domestic league. Melbourne Victory was the first to concede with a goal scored directly from a corner. After captain Mark Milligan could not convert a penalty kick and trailing on the score board, Leigh Broxham managed to provide a pass to Scott Galloway who then crossed a ball into the head of James Troisi scoring the equalizer.  Broxham then went on to capitalize on a loose ball from a corner with a shot outside the box into the net to score the eventual winner ending the match 2–1 to send Melbourne Victory to the Asian Champions League. Soon later on their first ACL Group stage match away against Guangzhou Evergrande, Broxham would score from a loose headed ball off a corner with a volley blasting into the back of the net to send Melbourne Victory 2–0 up, a match in which ended in a 2–4 defeat.

The 2014-2015 A-league calendar would continue to challenge Leigh Broxham to find a spot in the starting lineup with both Mark Milligan and new-signing Carl Valeri preferred as first choice central midfielders. International duties to Milligan and injuries to either Delpierre, Leijer or Ansell would call upon his services to fill in the gaps. Noticeably, Melbourne Victory's first clean-sheet came upon when Broxham was started at central defence and would keep a further 3 clean sheets in a row to start the season in the same position. Near the end of the season, Broxham became determined to find a place in the starting line-up after all key players in midfield and central defence were playing fit and consistent football and thus he subsequently landed his place at right-back. His combination play with Kosta Barbarouses and overlapping runs found himself in strong positions in the final third including an assist to Besart Berisha in the A-league semi-finals against Melbourne City after left-winger Harry Novillo failed to track back Broxham's run. It was then in the 2015 A-League Grand Final where his high pressing forced an eventual turnover from Sydney FC which lead to teammate Gui Finkler to assist Berisha to open the scoring. Whilst there were little opportunities to find overlapping runs for the entirety of the game, it was until the 90th minute where Fahid Ben Khalfallah found Leigh Broxham who sprinted from own half to receive the ball inside the box and finish the ball into the near post to seal the Championship 3–0.

Broxham also filled out as vice-captain on numerous occasions throughout the 2012–13 season, and captained Melbourne in the famous friendly match between Melbourne and Liverpool in front of over 95,500 at the MCG.

Playing style

Broxham is a versatile midfielder who can slot in as central defence, right-back, or a left-back when needed. His commitment on the pitch enforcing his presence against opposition players have been admired by all managers of Melbourne Victory including Ernie Merrick, Mehmet Durakovic, Jim Magilton, Ange Postecoglou and Kevin Muscat. His style of play can often be compared to Claude Makélélé, who, when in possession of the ball, makes seemingly overly conservative passes without posing a threat to the opposition. However, his role has revolved around recovering the ball from contests or off the opponent and being the first to start the string of passes where the team can construct an attack pattern. This potential was not seen until Ange Postecoglou took charge and changed the overall philosophy of the team and subsequently Broxham's recovery and distribution skills could be appreciated.

In the 2014/15 season, Broxham has found himself in central defence in no less than 6 matches to cover for the injuries to fellow defenders Matthieu Delpierre and Nick Ansell recording 4 clean sheets despite his obvious lack of height. Opposition's forward pressing were also noted to have failed as a result of Broxham's comfortable midfield ball control and awareness, who under pressure can easily advance forward and/or distribute passes reliably. Despite the previously mentioned lack of height, he has successfully scored with his head against Brisbane Roar in the 13/14 season, and Adelaide United in the 14/15 season. His aerial threat has been consistent throughout the 14/15 season including 3 attempted headers at goal against Brisbane Roar in a 1–0 win.
He also scored the third goal in the 2015 Grand Final win against Sydney FC at AAMI park with a near post finish following an over-lapping run on the right.

In the 2016/17 season, Broxham found himself occupying the left-back role giving consistent and reliable performances. During the latter parts of the season with the departure of midfielder Oliver Bozanic, Broxham returned to central midfield once again partnering with Carl Valeri and bossing the oppositions off the park especially during the finals series against Brisbane Roar and Sydney FC.

In the 2017/18 season with the departure of Daniel Georgievski, Broxham filled in the role of left-back for the season and in typical fashion performed reliably defensively. Broxham and the team finished the season with a championship trophy.

With the departure of Kevin Muscat, managers Marco Kurz, Carlos Salvachua and Grant Brebner mainly utilized Broxham back in the centre of midfield with the prospect of maintaining possession and distributing the ball laterally.

Career statistics

Club

International

Honours

Club
Melbourne Victory
 A-League Championship: 2006–07, 2008–09, 2014–15, 2017–18
 A-League Premiership: 2006–07, 2008–09, 2014–15
 Australia Cup: 2015,  2021

Country
Australia
 OFC U-17 Championship: 2005

Milestones
Despite not playing in its inaugural season, Leigh Broxham became the third footballer to play 150 A-League matches on 15 March 2014.  Coincidentally, the first two players to reach this milestone also play for Melbourne Victory – former topscorer Archie Thompson, and former captain Adrian Leijer, who reached this milestone earlier in the 2013/14 season, in the 1000th A-League match, a 0–2 loss to the Newcastle Jets.

Personal life
Broxham was born and raised in Melbourne, Victoria, Australia to parents of English ancestry.

His wife Sam gave birth to triplets in May 2016.

See also
List of Melbourne Victory FC players
List of one-club men

References

External links
 
 

1988 births
Living people
Soccer players from Melbourne
Melbourne Victory FC players
A-League Men players
Australia international soccer players
Victorian Institute of Sport alumni
Australian people of English descent
Association football defenders
Association football midfielders
Australian soccer players
Australia under-23 international soccer players